Jabar is a union council of Upper Dir District in Khyber Pakhtunkhwa, Pakistan. Upper Dir District has 6 Tehsils and 28 union councils.

See also 

 Upper Dir District

References

Upper Dir District
Union Councils of Upper Dir District
Union councils of Khyber Pakhtunkhwa